Blackthorne Publishing, Inc. was a comic book publisher that flourished from 1986–1989. They were notable for the Blackthorne 3-D Series, their reprint titles of classic comic strips like Dick Tracy, and their licensed products. Blackthorne achieved its greatest sales and financial success with their licensed 3-D comics adaptations of the California Raisins, but the financial loss suffered by the failure of their 3-D adaptation of Michael Jackson's film Moonwalker was a major contributor to the publisher's downfall.

History 
Blackthorne was established in 1985 by husband-and-wife team Steve Schanes and Ann Fera, formerly associated with Pacific Comics (which had gone out of business in 1984). Schanes explained, "My abilities have always been to sell and promote, and I needed to have a job to pay my debts and to maintain a minimum life-style with my family. Since I could not locate enough work where I was living, I decided to start up another company, so I borrowed on my credit cards and started Blackthorne." Schanes and Fera raised $16,000 to start Blackthorne (naming the company after the street on which they lived), mostly using their credit cards.

Blackthorne's first title was Jerry Iger's Classic Sheena, with a cover date of April 1985, featuring Sheena, Queen of the Jungle reprints and a new Dave Stevens cover. (The book had originally been slated as a Pacific Comics release.) Despite early struggles due to their limited funds, Blackthorne steadily expanded during its first years. To increase their profitability and visibility, the company employed sales representatives which sold their comics to retail stores not covered by any comic book distributors, such as Hallmark Cards, Spencer Gifts, and 7-Elevens nationwide. By the end of 1987, according to Schanes, the company was publishing 22 comic books a month and was distributing to 900–1,200 gift stores not covered by comics distributors. Meanwhile, Blackthorne earned praise from critics and hobbyists for its reprints of classic newspaper comic strips. Schanes chose to do newspaper strip reprints because they required less financial investment and because there was little competition in the field at the time. Blackthorne immediately bought the rights for 60 different newspaper strips, even though they knew they wouldn't be able to produce most of them for years at best, to lock out any competition in the field.

In addition to their comic book line, Blackthorne published paperback books and created faux books for movie props; for instance, the comic books and technical manuals seen in the movie Russkies are all props crafted by Blackthorne Publishing.

In 1987, however, with the company losing money on its color line, it canceled those titles to focus on its 3-D books and black-and-white licensed products. Blackthorne also suffered from the contemporaneous financial troubles of the Los Angeles-based distributor Sunrise Distribution. Sunrise went bankrupt in 1988, and although Blackthorne (along with fellow West Coast publisher Fantagraphics) sued the distributor, they were never able to recoup their losses. This in turn led to Blackthorne being audited by the federal government in 1988.

In early 1989, the company was still the fifth-largest U.S. comics publisher, bringing in about $1 million in sales and boasting a staff of eight full-time editorial and production employees. They published about 240 different titles a year, with an average print run of about 10,000 copies each. The company made a fatal error, however, when they signed on to adapt the Michael Jackson film Moonwalker to a 3-D comic book. The publisher paid a large licensing fee for the property and when the Moonwalker comic flopped later that year, they experienced a large financial loss.

By mid-1989 the company was outsourcing its operations, and in November the company laid off eight of its nine employees, including editor-in-chief John Stephenson. $180,000 in debt, Blackthorne limped into 1990 before it finally folded.

Titles

Original series 
 Adventures in the Mystwood, 1 issue
 Alien Ducklings, 4 issues
 Alien Worlds graphic novel
 Atomic Man Comics, 3 issues
 Blackthorne's 3-in-1, 2 issues
 Brik Hauss, 1 issue
 Cold Blooded Chameleon Commandos, 5 issues 
 Crow of the Bear Clan, 6 issues
 Danse, 1 issue
 Dogaroo, 1 issue
 Duckbots, 2 issues
 Enchanted Valley, 2 issues
 Failed Universe, 1 issue
 Figments, 3 issues
 Fragments (Black), 2 issues
 Freak-Out on Infant Earths, 2 issues — Crisis on Infinite Earths parody
 The Gift, 1 issue
 Ground Pound! Comix , 1 issue
 Hamster Vice, 6 issues — Miami Vice parody
 Jack Hunter (Vol. 1, color), 1 issue
 Jack Hunter (Vol. 11, Prestige format B&W), 3 issues
 Jax and the Hellhound, 3 issues
 Labor Force, 8 issues
 Lann graphic novel
 Laffin' Gas, 12 issues
 Legion Of Stupid Heroes, 1 issue — Legion of Super-Heroes parody
 Mad Dog Magazine, 3 issues
 The Man of Rust, 1 issue
 Midnite, 3 issues
 Mr. Cream Puff, 1 issue
 Nervous Rex, 10 issues
 Of Myths and Men, 2 issues
 Omega Elite, 1 issue
 Omni Men, 1 issue
 Operative: Scorpio graphic novel
 Outposts, 1 issue
 Pajama Chronicles, 1 issue
 Planet Comics, 3 issues
 Possibleman, 2 issues
 Pre-Teen Dirty-Gene Kung Fu Kangaroos, 3 issues — Teenage Mutant Ninja Turtles parody
 Red Heat, 2 issues
 Revolving Doors, 3 issues
 Roachmill, 6 issues
 Rivit, 1 issue
 Serius Bounty Hunter, 3 issues
 Shuriken graphic novel
 Starlight Squadron, 1 issue
 Street Poet Ray, 2 issues
 Street Wolf, 3 issues
 To Die For, 1 issue
 Timeline Color Comics, 1 issue (?)
 Tracker, 2 issues
 Twisted Tantrums of the Purple Snit, 2 issues
 Wings Comics graphic novel
 Wolph, 1 issue
 Xeno-Men, 1 issue
 X-L, graphic novel

Blackthorne 3-D Series 
80 issues
 3-D Bullwinkle & Rocky, 1 issue
 3-D Bullwinkle For President In 3-D, 1 issue
 3-D Heroes, 1 issue
 3-D Sports Hall of Shame, 1 issue
 Adventures of Capt. Holo 3-D, 1 issue
 Baby Huey 3-D, 1 issue
 BattleTech 3-D, 1 issue
 Betty Boop 3-D, 1 issue
 Bizarre 3-D Zone, 1 issue
 Bozo the Clown in 3-D, 3 issues
 Bravestarr in 3-D, 2 issues
 California Raisins in 3-D, 5 issues
 California Raisins:  The Ultimate Collection trade paperback
 Casper in 3-D, 1 issue
 Classic Jungle Comics, 1 issue
 Dick Tracy in 3-D, 1 issue
 The Flintstones in 3-D, 4 issues
 G.I. Joe in 3-D, 6 issues
 G.I. Joe in 3-D Annual, 1 issue
 Goldyn in 3-D, 1 issue
 Gumby 3-D, 7 issues
 Hamster Vice in 3-D, 2 issues
 Kull 3-D, 2 issues
 Lars of Mars in 3-D, 1 issue
 Laurel & Hardy in 3-D, 2 issues
 Little Dot 3-D, 1 issue
 Little Nemo in Slumberland 3-D, 1 issue
 Merlin Realm in 3-D, 1 issue
 Moonwalker in 3-D, 1 issue
 The Noid in 3-D, 2 issues
 Playful Little Audrey in 3-D, 1 issue
 Rambo III 3-D, 1 issue
 Red Sonja 3-D, 1 issue
 Richie Rich and Casper 3-D, 1 issue
 Sad Sack 3-D, 1 issue
 Salimba 3-D, 2 issues
 Sheena 3-D Special, 1 issue
 Solomon Kane 3-D, 1 issue
 Star Wars 3-D, 3 issues
 Transformers in 3-D, 3 issues
 To Die For 3-D, 1 issue
 Twisted Tales 3-D, 1 issue
 Underdog 3-D, 1 issue
 Waxwork 3-D, 1 issue
 Wendy in 3-D, 1 issue
 Werewolf 3-D, 1 issue

Licensed and reprint titles 
 Battle Beasts, 4 Issues
 Battle Force, 2 issues
 BattleTech, 6 issues
 BattleTech Annual
 Beyond Mars, 5 issues (later released as two-part trade paperback)
 Comic Strip Preserves series
 Betty Boop, 3 issues
 Boner's Ark, 1 issue
 Brenda Starr Reporter, 2 issues
 Smokey Stover, 1 issue
 Steve Roper and the Wahoo, 2 issues
 Tales of the Green Beret, 3 issues
 Dick Tracy series
 Dick Tracy Book, 21 issues
 Dick Tracy (Reuben series),  24 issues
 Dick Tracy Monthly/Weekly, 99 issues
 Dick Tracy Special, 3 issues
 Dick Tracy: The Early Years, 4 issues
 Dick Tracy: The Unprinted Stories, 4 issues
 Dick Tracy trade paperback
 The Iger Comics Kingdom trade paperback
 Jerry Iger's Classic Jumbo Comics, 1 issue
 Jerry Iger's Golden Features, 7 issues
 Jerry Iger's National Comics trade paperback
 Jungle Comics,  4 issues
 Kerry Drake, 5 issues
 Kirby: King of the Serials, 1 issue
 Little Nemo in Slumberland, 2 issues
 Li'l Abner (Reuben Series) trade paperback
 Official How to Draw series
 Official How to Draw G.I. Joe, 3 issues
 Official How to Draw Robotech, 14 issues
 Official How to Draw Transformers, 6 issues
 On Stage by Leonard Starr trade paperback
 Prince Valiant graphic novel, 2 issues
 Rambo, 1 issue
 Rambo III, 1 issue
 Rover from Gasoline Alley, 1 issue
 Salimba graphic novel
 Star Hawks, 4 issues
 Stories of the West, 2 issues
 Tales of the Jackalope, 7 issues
 Tarzan, 1 issue
 Waxwork, 1 issue
 Werewolf, 5 issues

Notes

References 
 
 
 Steve Schanes interview, David Anthony Kraft's Comics Interview #54–55 (1988)
 Duin, Steve, and Mike Richardson. Comics Between the Panels (Dark Horse Comics, Milwaukie, OR: 1998), p. 50.

 
Comic book publishing companies of the United States
Companies based in El Cajon, California
Defunct comics and manga publishing companies
Defunct companies based in California
Lists of comics by publisher
Publishing companies established in 1985
Publishing companies disestablished in 1990
1985 establishments in California
1990 disestablishments in California
American companies established in 1985